Saint-Barthélemy Channel is a strait in the Caribbean Sea that separates the French overseas collectivity of Saint Barthélemy and the island of Saint Martin, which is divided between a separate French overseas collectivity and Sint Maarten, a constituent country of the Kingdom of the Netherlands. The maritime boundary between Saint Bathélemy and Sint Maarten runs through Saint-Barthélemy Channel.

Landforms of Saint Barthélemy
International straits
Saint Barthélemy–Sint Maarten border
Straits of the Caribbean